Azzedine Doukha (born 5 August 1986) is an Algerian professional footballer who plays as a goalkeeper for CR Belouizdad and the Algeria national team.

Club career
Doukha was born in Chettia, Algeria.

On 31 August 2009 Doukha went on trial with Portuguese club Vitória de Setúbal.
In 2021, he signed a contract with JS Kabylie.
In 2022, he joined CR Belouizdad.

International career
On 28 December 2010 Doukha made his debut for the Algerian A' national team starting in a 3–1 friendly win over Chad.

On 14 May 2011 Doukha was called up to the Algerian national team for the first time for a 2012 Africa Cup of Nations qualifier against Morocco.

Honours

Club
USM El Harrach
 Algerian Cup runners-up: 2011

National
Algeria
 Africa Cup of Nations: 2019

References

External links
 
 

1986 births
Living people
People from Chettia
Algeria A' international footballers
Algeria international footballers
Algeria under-23 international footballers
Algerian footballers
Algerian Ligue Professionnelle 1 players
ASO Chlef players
USM El Harrach players
MC Alger players
MO Béjaïa players
JSM Tiaret players
JS Kabylie players
Association football goalkeepers
Expatriate footballers in Saudi Arabia
Algerian expatriate sportspeople in Saudi Arabia
Saudi Professional League players
Ohod Club players
Al-Raed FC players
2011 African Nations Championship players
2013 Africa Cup of Nations players
2015 Africa Cup of Nations players
2019 Africa Cup of Nations players
21st-century Algerian people